Council of Senior Scholars may refer to:
Council of Senior Scholars (Saudi Arabia)
Council of Senior Scholars (Egypt)